The following highways are numbered 20D:

United States
  Nebraska Highway 20D (former)
  New York State Route 20D (former)

See also
 List of highways numbered 20